Bi Bayan (also Romanized as Bī Bayān; also known as Bī Bayānī, Bībeyānī, and Bībīānī) is a village in Dasht-e Zahab Rural District, in the Central District of Sarpol-e Zahab County, Kermanshah Province, Iran. At the 2006 census, its population was 282, in 52 families.

References 

Populated places in Sarpol-e Zahab County